Kvichak Bay is an arm on the northeast side of Bristol Bay in southern Alaska, at .

Bays of Alaska
Bodies of water of Bristol Bay Borough, Alaska
Bodies of water of Lake and Peninsula Borough, Alaska